Estadio La Ciudadela is a multi-use stadium in Tucumán, Argentina. It is primarily used for football and is currently the home ground for San Martín de Tucumán. The stadium holds 30,250 people.

References

San Martín de Tucumán
Sports venues in Argentina
La Ciudadela